The 2017 Primera B de Chile, known as the 2017 Campeonato de Transición Loto for sponsorship purposes, was the 64th season of Chile's second-tier football league. The competition began on 29 July 2017.

Teams

Stadia and locations

a: Deportes Copiapó temporarily plays its home games at Estadio La Caldera in Caldera due to remodeling works at Estadio Luis Valenzuela Hermosilla.
b: Unión La Calera temporarily plays its home games at Estadio Municipal Lucio Fariña Fernández in Quillota due to remodeling works at Estadio Municipal Nicolás Chahuán Nazar.

Standings

Results

Top goalscorers

Source: Soccerway

Promotion playoff
The promotion playoff was played by three teams: Santiago Wanderers, as the last-placed in the Primera División relegation table, 2016–17 Primera B runners-up San Marcos de Arica, and 2017 Primera B champions Unión La Calera. The two Primera B teams played each other with the winner qualifying to the final against the Primera División team for promotion to the top flight for the 2018 season.

Relegation
Relegation was determined at the end of the season by computing an average of the number of points earned per game over the two most recent seasons: 2016–17 and 2017. The team with the lowest average was relegated to the Segunda División Profesional.

See also
 2017 Chilean Primera División

References

External links
Primera B on ANFP's website

Primera B de Chile seasons
Primera B
Chile